Events in the year 1909 in Germany.

Incumbents

National level
 Kaiser – Wilhelm II
 Chancellor – Bernhard von Bülow until 14 July, then Theobald von Bethmann Hollweg

State level

Kingdoms
 King of Bavaria – Otto of Bavaria
 King of Prussia – Kaiser Wilhelm II
 King of Saxony – Frederick Augustus III of Saxony
 King of Württemberg – William II of Württemberg

Grand Duchies
 Grand Duke of Baden – Frederick II
 Grand Duke of Hesse – Ernest Louis
 Grand Duke of Mecklenburg-Schwerin – Frederick Francis IV
 Grand Duke of Mecklenburg-Strelitz – Adolphus Frederick V
 Grand Duke of Oldenburg – Frederick Augustus II
 Grand Duke of Saxe-Weimar-Eisenach – William Ernest

Principalities
 Schaumburg-Lippe – George, Prince of Schaumburg-Lippe
 Schwarzburg-Rudolstadt – Günther Victor, Prince of Schwarzburg-Rudolstadt (who assumed the title "Prince of Schwarzburg" from 28 March)
 Schwarzburg-Sondershausen – Charles Gonthier, Prince of Schwarzburg-Sondershausen to 28 March, then Günther Victor, Prince of Schwarzburg
 Principality of Lippe – Leopold IV, Prince of Lippe
 Reuss Elder Line – Heinrich XXIV, Prince Reuss of Greiz (with Heinrich XIV, Prince Reuss Younger Line as regent)
 Reuss Younger Line – Heinrich XIV, Prince Reuss Younger Line
 Waldeck and Pyrmont – Friedrich, Prince of Waldeck and Pyrmont

Duchies
 Duke of Anhalt – Frederick II, Duke of Anhalt
 Duke of Brunswick – Duke John Albert of Mecklenburg (regent)
 Duke of Saxe-Altenburg – Ernst II, Duke of Saxe-Altenburg
 Duke of Saxe-Coburg and Gotha – Charles Edward, Duke of Saxe-Coburg and Gotha
 Duke of Saxe-Meiningen – Georg II, Duke of Saxe-Meiningen

Colonial Governors
 Cameroon (Kamerun) – Theodor Seitz (3rd term) to 10 February, then Wilhelm Peter Hansen (acting governor) to October, the again Theodor Seitz (4th and final term)
 Kiaochow (Kiautschou) – Oskar von Truppel
 German East Africa (Deutsch-Ostafrika) – Georg Albrecht Freiherr von Rechenberg
 German New Guinea (Deutsch-Neuguinea) – Albert Hahl (2nd term)
 German Samoa (Deutsch-Samoa) – Wilhelm Solf
 German South-West Africa (Deutsch-Südwestafrika) – Bruno von Schuckmann
 Togoland – Johann Nepomuk Graf Zech auf Neuhofen

Events
 19 December: German football club Borussia Dortmund was founded.
 Summer – German Chemists Fritz Haber and Carl Bosch first demonstrate the Haber process, the catalytic formation of ammonia from hydrogen and atmospheric nitrogen under conditions of high temperature and pressure.

Undated 
 Bavaria 09 Berlin, German association football club founded.
 A team under German chemist Fritz Hofmann first synthesizes synthetic rubber (Methylkautschuk).
 Linde–Frank–Caro process was invented by Adolf Frank and developed with Carl von Linde and Heinrich Caro.

(Methylkautschuk).

Births

 4 January – Cilly Aussem, German tennis player (died 1963)
 8 January – Willy Millowitsch, German actor (died 1999)
 15 January – Jean Bugatti, German automobile designer (died 1939)
 31 January – Yosef Burg German-born Israeli politician and rabbi (died 1999)
 3 February – Kurt Petter, physician, youth leader and educational administrator (died 1969)
 20 February – Heinz Erhardt, German comedian (died 1979)
 19 March – Otto John, German lawyer (died 1997)
 27 March – Golo Mann, German historian, essayist and writer (died 1994)
 2 April – Otto Haxel, German nuclear physicist (died 1998)
 23 April – Karl Klasen, German banker (died 1991)
 24 April: Bernhard Grzimek German zoo director, zoologist, book author, editor, and animal conservationist in postwar West-Germany.(died 1987)
 Konrad Frey, German gymnast (died 1974)
 Werner Jacobs, German film director (died 1999)
 25 April – Ludwig Martin, German lawyer (died 2010)
 26 April – Marianne Hoppe, German actress (died 2002)
 8 May – Paul May, German film director (died 1976)
 11 May – Georg von Holtzbrinck, German publisher (died 1983)
 22 May – Willi Geiger, German judge (died 1994)
 25 May – Alfred Kubel, German politician (died 1999)
 21 June — Helmut Möckel, youth leader and politician (died 1945)
 22 June – Heinrich Graf von Lehndorff-Steinort, German officer (died 1944)
 4 July – Alex Seidel, German weapons manufacturer (died 1989)
 7 July – Gottfried von Cramm, tennis player (died 1976)
 22 July – Franz-Josef Röder, politician (died 1979)
 9 August – Adam von Trott zu Solz, German diplomat (died 1944)
 13 August – Werner Otto, German businessman (died 2011)
 5 September – Hans Carste, German composer and conductor (died 1971)
 7 September – Kurt A. Körber, German entrepreneur (died 1992)
 14 October – Bernd Rosemeyer, German racing driver (died 1938)
 25 October – Dieter Borsche, German actor (died 1982)
 30 October – Carl Lange, German actor (died 1999)
 7 November – Ezriel Carlebach, German-born Israeli journalist and publicist (died 1956)
 2 December – Marion Dönhoff, German journalist (died 2002)
 23 December – Joachim Werner, German archaeologist (died 1994)

Deaths

 22 January – Emil Erlenmeyer, chemist (born 1825)
 2 February – Adolf Stoecker, German pastor and politician (born 1835)
 26 February – Hermann Ebbinghaus, psychologist (born 1850)
 24 March – Alfred Messel, German architect (born 1853)
 28 March – Charles Gonthier, Prince of Schwarzburg-Sondershausen, nobleman (born 1830)
 30 April – Albert Langen, German publisher (born 1869)
 9 May – Margarete Steiff, German seamstress and company founder (born 1847)
 13 May – Heinrich Limpricht, German chemist (born 1827)
 19 May - Gustav zu Bentheim-Tecklenburg, German politician (born 1849)
 24 May – Georg von Neumayer, German polar explorer (born 1826)
 3 June - Theodor Barth, German politician and publicis (born 1849)
 8 June – Fritz Overbeck, German painter (born 1869)
 3 July – Hermann Johannes Pfannenstiel, German gynecologist (born 1862)
 13 October – Julius Ruthardt, German violinist and composer (born 1841)
 30 October – Leopold Sonnemann, German newspaper publisher (born 1831)
 16 December – Ludwig Friedländer, German philologist (born 1824)

References

 
Years of the 20th century in Germany
Germany
Germany